The Statue of Jacob Zuma is a bronze monument erected by Governor Rochas Okorocha of Imo State. The monument commemorated the visit of the South African President, Jacob Zuma who visited Imo State when he was still the President. Governor Okorocha stated during the unveiling of the statue that: "We have decided to honor you for your love for education, though you were deprived in your early days in life but you are working to make sure that every poor child went to school". The unveiling was done in the state capital Owerri during a ceremony attended by former President Olusegun Obasanjo, former governors, chiefs and distinguished members of the state.

The statue was a life-sized monument that cost around 520million Naira which is the equivalent to $1.4 million. The Zuma as reported by BBC Pidgin "dey among di seven odas wey Governor Rochas Okorocha arrange full Imo State capital, Owerri."

A Memorandum of Understanding (MOU) was signed by Governor Okorocha and President Zuma, to  provide free education for poor children on the continent. President Zuma was also given  a Chieftaincy title of Ochiagha Imo that translates to the ceremonial leader of warriors  by Eze Imo, Samuel Ohiri. He received a Merit Award and a street was also named after him. The Jacob Zuma statue generated lots of debate and complaints.

References 

Statues in Nigeria
Monuments and memorials in Nigeria